The women's road race C1–3 event in cycling at the 2012 Summer Paralympics took place on 6 September at Brands Hatch. Nine riders from seven different nations competed. The race distance was 48 km.

Results
DNF = Did Not Finish

Source:

References

Women's road race C1-3
2012 in women's road cycling